Commons is a general term for shared resources, typically used in political economic theory. 

Commons may also refer to:

Shared resources
 Common good (disambiguation)
 Common land, shared areas of land; has a specific legal meaning in the British Isles
 Global commons, term used for international commons in political economic theory

Computing and Internet
 Apache Commons, repository of reusable Java programming language components
 Creative Commons, licensing system for creative works
 Digital commons (economics), a form of commons involving the distribution and communal ownership of informational resources and technology
 Digital Commons (Elsevier), a commercial, hosted institutional repository platform owned by RELX Group
 Wikimedia Commons, a project of the Wikimedia Foundation that serves as an online repository of images, sound, and other media files

Places

Electoral districts 
 Commons (ward), Christchurch, England

Northern Ireland townlands
 Commons, County Down, in the List of townlands in County Down
 Commons, County Fermanagh, in the List of townlands in County Fermanagh
 Commons, County Tyrone, in the List of townlands in County Tyrone

Shopping centers
 Algonquin Commons, a large outdoor shopping center in Algonquin, Illinois, US, often referred to as "the Commons"
 Ithaca Commons, a shopping street in Ithaca, New York, US

People
 John R. Commons (1862–1945), economist and labour historian
 Jamie N Commons (born 1988), British singer and songwriter
 Kim Commons (1951–2015), American chess master
 Kris Commons (born 1983), Scottish footballer
 Michael Commons (born 1939), American scientist

Media
 Commmons, a Japanese record label
 The Commons (TV series), a 2020 Australian series on Stan

Political parties

 Commons (Chilean political party)
 Commons (Colombian political party)

Other uses
 House of Commons, the elected lower houses of the parliaments of the United Kingdom and Canada, colloquially referred to as "the Commons"
 Commons, a concurrency road or other place where multiple roadways share pavement

See also
 Common (disambiguation)
 Common good (disambiguation)
 Commoner (disambiguation)
 The Common (disambiguation)
 
 Commonlands, an area in the game EverQuest 1 and 2